Belinda Lucy Lange (born 23 December 1953), known professionally as Belinda Lang, is an English actress. She is known for playing Liza in the ITV sitcom Second Thoughts (1991–94), and Bill Porter in the BBC sitcom 2point4 Children (1991–99). Her theatre credits include London productions of the Noël Coward plays, Present Laughter (1981), Blithe Spirit (1997), and Hay Fever (2006). Her radio/audio credits include voicing narrator Madeleine in the podcast Wooden Overcoats.

Early life
Lang was born in Marylebone, London, in 1953, the daughter of actors Jeremy Hawk and Joan Heal.

Career

Television
Lang is perhaps best known for her starring roles in three sitcoms – as Kate in Dear John, as Bill Porter in 2point4 Children and as Liza Ferrari in Second Thoughts.

After a small part as 'Girl in Bath' in Play for Today in 1980 she appeared in the 1980 miniseries To Serve Them All My Days, following this she had several one-off appearances and small parts until her role in Dear John. Following Dear John (1986–1987), she played Martha in The Bretts (1987–1988) during which she acted alongside her future husband, Hugh Fraser and during the same period also appeared as Sheila Walsh in Bust. Lang also had a lead part in the television series Inspector Alleyn Mysteries, in which she played the artist Agatha Troy between 1990 and 1994.

In 1991, she took a lead role in 2point4 Children alongside Gary Olsen. The sitcom would run for 8 series until it ended in 1999 due to the illness of Olsen leading to his death in 2000. In 2000, she appeared as Christine Hamilton in the television film Justice in Wonderland.

Following 2point4 Children, Lang has rarely appeared on television, instead taking on more stage work. She has, however, made guest appearances in several programmes including; playing the ill-fated business woman, Elspeth Inkpen-Thomas, in Midsomer Murders, alongside John Nettles and television presenter Quinnie Dorrell in "The Gongoozlers", a 2004 episode of the murder mystery series Rosemary and Thyme, and a couple of episodes of the BBC daytime soap opera Doctors. In 2009, she made a brief return to sitcom, playing Margot in an episode of BBC sitcom My Family, and then in 2014 playing Marina Fairchild in Citizen Khan, another BBC series.

In 2022 she appears as landlady Mrs Clam in Sister Boniface Mysteries in a recurring role.

Radio
In 1988, Lang appeared in the BBC Radio 4 play Hard of Hearing opposite Graham Blockey. She took part in Stilgoe's Around, also broadcast on Radio 4 and BBC Radio 2. Second Thoughts was based on a radio programme originally broadcast on Radio 4. From 2015 to 2022, a hiatus for production required due to the COVID-19 pandemic, she voiced the anthropomorphic mouse and narrator Madeleine in the sitcom audio podcast Wooden Overcoats.

Personal life
In 1988 she married actor Hugh Fraser, with whom she has one daughter, Lily.

Television credits
 Play for Today – Girl in bath (1980)
 To Serve Them All My Days – Beth (1980)
 The Cabbage Patch – Susie (1983)
 A Brother's Tale – Eileen Taylor (1983)
 Operation Julie – D.C Joy Brookes (1985)
 Unnatural Causes – Helen Cassady (1986)
 Victoria Wood As Seen on TV – Soldiers Girlfriend (1986)
 Dear John – Kate (1986–1987)
 The Bretts – Martha (1987–1988)
 Bust – Sheila Walsh (1987–1988)
 Stay Lucky – Lady Karen Winderscale (1989)
 Making News – Suzanne Critchley (1990)
 Alleyn Mysteries – Agatha Troy (1990–1994)
 Second Thoughts – Liza Ferrari (1991–1994)
 The Office – Mrs Platt (voice only) (1996)
 2point4 Children – Bill Porter (1991–1999)
 Justice in Wonderland – Christine Hamilton (2000)
 Midsomer Murders – Elspeth Inkpen-Thomas (2000)
 Rosemary & Thyme – Quinnie Dorell (2004)
 Three Minute Moments – Esther (2007)
 Doctors – Anne Marie Cavendish (2008)
 My Family – Margot (2009)
 Citizen Khan – Marina Fairchild (2014)
 Sister Boniface Mysteries - Mrs Clam (2022)

Theatre
 Teeth 'n' Smiles 1977 (Laura)
Lang has taken on many stage roles. She is part of the cast of the touring play Seven Deadly Sins Four Deadly Sinners and Ladies in Lavender starring alongside Hayley Mills

Lang appeared with Nicholas Farrell and David Robb in Alan Bennett's "Single Spies" play during 2016. Her other theatre credits include Present Laughter (1981), The Clandestine Marriage (1984), Dead Funny (1995), Blithe Spirit (1997), and Hay Fever (2006).  BBC Proms 2017 "Aunt Eller" in Oklahoma with the John Wilson Orchestra (2017).

She is now a vice-president of the theatre charity The Theatrical Guild, having been involved with them for many years. Lang was chairman from 2009 to 2011 and continues to help promote them among the theatrical profession.

References

External links
 

1953 births
Living people
English soap opera actresses
English stage actresses
English television actresses
Actresses from London
People from Marylebone
20th-century English actresses
21st-century English actresses